Tangley is a village in the English county of Hampshire. Tangley is situated north of the old market town of Andover and the village of Charlton, Hampshire.

It lies in the north west corner of Hampshire and most of it is an officially designated Area of Outstanding Natural Beauty.

The houses are typical of the different kinds to be found in the area with the older ones being of flint and brick and chalk cob with thatched or tiled roofs.

A walk through the parish of Tangley takes one through woodland, downland and farmland.  The villages are scattered over the chalklands south of the Hampshire downs, on high land which overlooks the Bourne valley to the north and the remains of Chute Forest to the west.

History
The name Tangley is Anglo-Saxon. The earliest reference, in 1174, calls it Tangelea, meaning a wood or clearing (leah) on a tongue, or perhaps tongues, of land. Tangelea 1175. Possibly 'woodland clearing at the spits of land'. Old English tang + leah

In the sixteenth century the manor of Tangley was owned by the Reade family,  whose most distinguished member was Sir Richard Reade (1511–1575),  who served as Lord Chancellor of Ireland in the 1540s.

Tangley has a War Memorial dedicated to those who gave their lives in the Great War of 1914–1918.

Tangley has become famous for the devastating fire that consumed its manor house, and resulted in the deaths of MP Michael Colvin and his wife in February 2000.

The small Victorian church of St Thomas is surrounded by its old graveyard with ancient yew trees. People have prayed here for centuries and three sarsen stones remain, as possible evidence there  was pagan worship there before Christian times.

Landmarks
Tangley was the last point for the drovers who walked their sheep over the downs to the Weyhill Fair in October each year. Tangley offered refreshments and lodging to the drovers, and their flocks in the form of five inns or beer houses, of which two remain – The Fox to the south and The Cricketer's in the centre of the village.
Cricketers Arms
The Fox Inn

Tangley Parish Hall, which was rebuilt in 1959, is situated in the peaceful village of Wildhern. It lies on a -acre site which is in a designated area of outstanding natural beauty.

External links

Tangley parish website
Visions of Britain - Tangley

References

Villages in Hampshire
Test Valley